Eisenbergiella tayi is a species of bacteria first isolated from human blood. It is anaerobic, rod-shaped, and non-motile. It is the first member of the proposed genus Eisenbergiella.

References

External links
Type strain of Eisenbergiella tayi at BacDive -  the Bacterial Diversity Metadatabase

Lachnospiraceae
Bacteria described in 2013